This is a list of toys and toy lines produced by Hasbro, a large toy and game company based in North America.

A 
Air Raiders (discontinued toy line)
Aladdin
Angry Birds Telepods
Ant-Man
Ant-Man and the Wasp
Apex Legends (coming soon)
Army Ants
The Avengers
Avengers: Age of Ultron
Avengers: Infinity War
Avengers: Endgame

B
Baby Alive
Barney & Friends
Batman Beyond
Battle Beasts
Beauty and the Beast
Beyblade
BeyWheelz
Black Panther
Black Widow
Blythe
Bob the Builder
Bonka Zonks
Boohbah
Brother Bear
Built to Rule (abbreviated BTR)
Bull's-Eye Ball

C
Cabbage Patch Kids (1989–1994)
Captain America: The First Avenger
Captain America: The Winter Soldier
Captain America: Civil War
Charmkins
Chasin' Cheeky
Chicken Little
 Chomp Squad 
C.O.P.S. 'n Crooks
CribLife

D
Descendants
Descendants 2
Descendants 3
Disney Princess (2016–present)
Death Row Records
Dolly Darling dolls (1965-1968)

E
Easy-Bake Oven
Elefun
Elena of Avalor

F
Fantastic Four
Fantastic Four: Rise of the Silver Surfer
The Falcon and the Winter Soldier
Finding Nemo
Flubber (recalled)
Fortnite (2019–present)
Freaktown
Frozen (2016–present)
Olaf's Frozen Adventure
Frozen 2
Funny Mooners
Furby
FurReal

G
Gator Golf
Ghostbusters (Started in 2020)
Ghostbusters: Afterlife
G.I. Joe
G.I. Joe: America's Movable Fighting Man
G.I. Joe Adventure Team
G.I. Joe: A Real American Hero
Action Force (European brand of A Real American Hero)
G.I. Joe Extreme
Hall of Fame
Masterpiece Edition
G.I. Joe: Resolute
Timeless Collection
G.I. Joe vs. Cobra
Classic Collection
G.I. Joe: Sigma 6
G.I. Joe: The Rise of Cobra
G.I. Joe: Retaliation
Giraffalaff limbo
Glo Worm
Gobots (licensed by Tonka)
Gotta Dance Girls

H
Hanazuki: Full of Treasures (2017-2019)
Harry Potter
Hoppity Hooper
Hungry Hungry Hippos

I
Inhumanoids
Iron Man
Iron Man 2
Iron Man 3
Iron Man: Armored Adventures
The Incredibles
The Incredible Hulk
Indiana Jones

J
Javelin Darts (discontinued)
Jem and the Holograms
James Bond Jr.
The Jungle Book 2
Jurassic Park (1993-2017)
Jurassic World (2015-2017)

K
Kaijudo
Kooky Spookys finger puppets
Koosh
Kre-O

L
Lazer Tag
Lilo and Stitch
The Lion King
 Little Big Bites 
Littlest Pet Shop
Little Miss No Name
Lincoln Logs
Lock Stars
Lite-Brite
Luna Petunia
Lost Kitties

M
Madagascar
M.A.S.K.
Marvel Legends
Marvel Super Hero Squad
Marvel Universe
Maxie
Medabots
Men in Black
Mighty Muggs
Moana
Monster Face
Monsters, Inc.
Moondreamers
Mousetrap
Mr. Potato Head
Mrs. Potato Head
My Little Pony
My Little Pony: Generation One
My Little Pony (TV series)
My Little Pony: The Movie (1986 film)
My Little Pony Tales
My Little Pony: Generation Two
My Little Pony: Generation Three
My Little Pony direct-to-video animated features
My Little Pony: Generation 4
My Little Pony: Friendship is Magic
My Little Pony: The Movie (2017 film)
My Little Pony: Equestria Girls
My lov’ems

N
Nerf
NakNak
The New Batman Adventures

O
Operation
Overwatch (2019–present)

P
Pandalian
Peteena the Pampered Poodle (1966)
Planet of the Apes
Play-Doh
Pokémon (1998-2005)
Pound Puppies
Pound Puppies (2010 TV series)
Power Rangers (2019–present)
Power Rangers Beast Morphers
Power Rangers Dino Fury
Power Rangers Lightning Collection
P-O-X
Princess Gwenevere and the Jewel Riders
Puppy Surprise

R
Record Breakers: World of Speed
Rubbadubbers
Rubik's Cube

S
Secret Central
Sesame Street (2010-2022)
Sgt. Savage and his Screaming Eagles
Shark Tale

Shoezies
Shrek 2
Sindy
Sound Bites
Speed Stars
Spider-Man
Spider-Man 3
The Spectacular Spider-Man
Ultimate Spider-Man
The Amazing Spider-Man
The Amazing Spider-Man 2
Spider-Man: Homecoming
Spider-Man: Far From Home
Spider-Man: Into the Spider-Verse
Spirograph
Star Wars (2000–present)
Star Wars: Episode II – Attack of the Clones
Star Wars: Episode III – Revenge of the Sith
Star Wars: The Clone Wars
Star Wars Rebels
Star Wars: The Force Awakens
Rogue One: A Star Wars Story
Star Wars Forces of Destiny
Star Wars: The Last Jedi
Solo: A Star Wars Story
Star Wars: The Rise of Skywalker
The Mandalorian
Stretch Armstrong
Stretch Armstrong and the Flex Fighters
Stuart Little
Super Robot Monkey Team Hyperforce Go!
Stargate
.S.P.A.C.E.
Super Soaker

T
Teletubbies
Thor
Thor: The Dark World
Thor: Ragnarok
Tinkertoys
Top Wing
Toy Story 
Transformers
Transformers: Generation 1
Transformers: Generation 2
BotCon
Beast Wars
Machine Wars
Beast Machines
Robots in Disguise
Armada
Universe
Energon
Alternators
Cybertron
Classics
Animated
Universe 2.0
Revenge of the Fallen
Hunt for the Decepticons
Reveal the Shield
Generations
Prime
Dark of the Moon
Marvel Transformers
Star Wars Transformers (2007)
Bumblebee
Transformers: Cyberverse
Transformers: Rescue Bots
Transformers: Rescue Bots Academy
Treasure Planet
Trolls
Trolls Holiday
Trolls: The Beat Goes On!
Trolls World Tour
Trolls: TrollsTopia
Tweenies
The Wizard of Oz fashion dolls (2023-present) (Turner Entertainment / Warner Bros. Entertainment toys)

V
Visionaries: Knights of the Magical Light
Video Now
Vivien Leigh as Scarlett O'Hara from Gone with the Wind (1939) (fashion doll) (2023 fashion doll version)

W
Waddingtons
Winston Steinburger and Sir Dudley Ding Dong
World of Love, a line of 9" "Hippie" Fashion Dolls, clothes, and accessories (1971 -1973)
World Wrestling Federation (1990–1994)
Weebles

X
Xevoz, A cancelled toyline that numerous groups have petitioned to bring back.
The X's
X-Men Origins: Wolverine

Y
Yellies
Yo-kai Watch (2016–present for International)

Z
Zoids
 Zoops

See also
List of Hasbro games

References

External links
Official Hasbro website

Hasbro
Hasbro